The Kaminskas Jungster I aka Papoose RK-1 Jungmeister I is a single-seat homebuilt biplane.

Development
The Jungster I is a single-engine, single-seat biplane with conventional landing gear. It was intended to be an 80 percent scale replica of the Bücker Bü 133 for homebuilt construction. The wings are swept back an additional two degrees from the Jungmeister. The fuselage uses wood trusses and the wings use spruce wood spars with fabric covering.

Rights to the Jungster I were sold to Kate & Stan McLeod (K & S). The plans are distributed by Howard Allmon.

Variants
Kaminskas Jungster II A parasol version based on the Jungster I

Specifications (Kaminskas Jungster I)

See also

Notes

References

External links
 Jungster I

Homebuilt aircraft